Dennis Salazar Chung (born 24 January 2001) is a professional footballer who plays as a right-back or a right winger for ADT. Born to Chinese father and Filipino mother in Germany, he is a youth international for the Philippines.

Club career

Youth
As a youth player, he joined the youth academy of Hertha BSC in the German Bundesliga. In 2019, Chung signed for German fifth division side Hertha 03.

College
Before the 2021 season, he joined the Harcum Bears in the United States.

Azkals Development Team
In 2021, he signed for Filipino club ADT.

International career
Chung is eligible to represent the Philippines internationally through his mother and is also eligible to represent China internationally through his father.

Philippines U23
In 2019, Chung was included in the 20-man squad for the 30th Southeast Asian Games. He made his debut for the Philippines U-23 team in a 1–1 draw against Cambodia, scoring the equalizer in the 86th minute.

In 2021, Chung was included in the 23-man squad for the 2022 AFC U-23 Asian Cup qualification matches against South Korea, Singapore and Timor-Leste.

At the 2022 AFF U-23 Championship, Chung scored in a 2–1 win against Brunei.

In 2022, Chung was included in the 20-man squad for the 31st Southeast Asian Games held in Vietnam. He scored in the opening match against Timor-Leste, which the Philippines won 4–0.

Philippines
Chung was included in the Philippines' 24-man squad for the 2020 AFF Championship.

References

External links
 

Living people
2001 births
Footballers from Berlin
Filipino people of Chinese descent
German sportspeople of Filipino descent
German people of Chinese descent
Citizens of the Philippines through descent
Filipino footballers
German footballers
Association football defenders
Philippines youth international footballers
Azkals Development Team players
Filipino expatriate footballers
German expatriate footballers
Filipino expatriate sportspeople in the United States
German expatriate sportspeople in the United States
Expatriate soccer players in the United States
Competitors at the 2021 Southeast Asian Games
Southeast Asian Games competitors for the Philippines